Vitex gigantea is a species of tree in the family Lamiaceae. It is native to Panama and South America.

References 

gigantea
Trees of Panama
Trees of Peru
Trees of Ecuador
Trees of Colombia
Trees of Bolivia